Gérard Soisson (1935–1983) was a Luxemburgish banker who was at the center of the Clearstream Affair. He was the person who authorized each non-published account, which would be known only by some insiders, including the auditors and members of the council of administration. 

Whereas Soisson had refused numerous requests to open non-published accounts from such institutions as Chase Manhattan in New York City, Chemical Bank of London and numerous subsidiaries of Citibank, Cedel opened hundreds of non-published accounts — all of them irregular — especially after the arrival of CEO André Lussi in 1990. 

By 1980, Ernest Backes had become Cedel's #3, in charge of relations with clients, but he was fired in May 1983, allegedly because he "knew too much about the Ambrosiano scandal". Two months after his dismissal, Gérard Soisson was found dead in Corsica. 

With Soisson out of the way, there was nothing to stop the abuse of the system, wrote Lucy Komisar. No longer were they just sub-accounts of officially listed accounts, Backes charges. Some were for banks that were not subsidiaries or even official members of Cedel. 

At the start of 1995, Cedel had more than 2,200 published accounts. But in reality, according to documents obtained by Backes, Cedel that year managed more than 4,200 accounts, leading to an alleged total of 2,000 unpublished accounts in 1995.

1935 births
1983 deaths
French bankers